

The Magni Vale PM-3-4 was an Italian civil monoplane for use as a tourer or aerobatic trainer designed and built by Piero Magni-Aviazione in Milan.

Design and development
The Vale was a sleek single-seat parasol wing braced monoplane powered by a  Farina T.58 radial engine. An improved variant, the Supervale PM-4-1 had a  Fiat A.54 engine. The start of the second world war halted design and development by the company.

Variants
Vale PM-3-4
Powered by a  Farina T.58 radial engine.
Supervale PM-4-1
Powered by a  Fiat A.54 engine.

Specifications (Vale) 
Performance figures calculated

References

Notes

Bibliography

1930s Italian civil utility aircraft
Single-engined tractor aircraft
Parasol-wing aircraft